This is a list of players who scored over 100 goals in Major League Soccer, the top flight men's soccer league of the United States and Canada, dating back to its inaugural season in 1996. This list does not include goals scored in the MLS Cup Playoffs. Eleven players have reached the milestone.

The first MLS player to reach 100 goals was Jason Kreis on August 13, 2005 with his goal in Real Salt Lake's 4–2 loss to the Kansas City Wizards (now Sporting Kansas City). On August 22, 2007 Jaime Moreno took the record from Kreis with his 109th goal, a penalty in a 3–1 win over his former team the New York Red Bulls. Moreno retired in 2010 with 133 goals and held the record until August 27, 2011 when Jeff Cunningham scored his final MLS goal for Columbus Crew SC in their 6–2 defeat at Seattle Sounders FC. On May 25, 2014 Landon Donovan broke the record with his 135th goal in a 4–1 Los Angeles Galaxy win over the Philadelphia Union; he retired in 2016 with 145 goals. The record was subsequently broken on May 18, 2019, as Chris Wondolowski scored his 146th goal in a 4–1 win for the San Jose Earthquakes over the Chicago Fire.

Of the eleven players, seven are Americans and one, Dwayne De Rosario, is Canadian. The highest scoring foreigner is Kei Kamara of Sierra Leone, with 139 goals. The other two foreign players, Jaime Moreno of Bolivia and Bradley Wright-Phillips of England, are the highest scoring South American and European respectively.

List

Key
 Bold shows players still playing in Major League Soccer.
 Italics show players still playing professional soccer in other leagues.

Notes 

100
United States